Kasli is a town and the administrative center of Kaslinsky District in Chelyabinsk Oblast, Russia, located among several lakes on the eastern slope of the Middle Urals,  northwest of Chelyabinsk, the administrative center of the oblast. Population:

History
It was founded in 1747 as the settlement of Kaslinsky around a foundry. Town status was granted to it on July 29, 1942.

The Kasli plant became famous for its cast iron castings in the mid-19th century. In 1900, an open-work pavilion was molded from metal for the international exhibition. It is now exhibited in the Yekaterinburg picture gallery.

Administrative and municipal status
Within the framework of administrative divisions, Kasli serves as the administrative center of Kaslinsky District. As an administrative division, it is, together with one rural locality (the settlement of Prigorodny), incorporated within Kaslinsky District as the Town of Kasli. As a municipal division, the Town of Kasli is incorporated within Kaslinsky Municipal District as Kaslinskoye Urban Settlement.

Economy
The leading branches of industry are non-ferrous metallurgy, machine-building, and metal-working. There is also a radio plant and a clothes factory.

Dairy and meat farming prevails in agriculture. Potato growing is developed.

Sights

Museum of decorative castings
Kasli is famous for Kasli iron sculpture—artistic figures made of cast iron. The cast sculptures of Klodt, Lancere, Solovyova, and other prominent artists are among the most famous works in the Museum of Decorative Castings. In 1860, the Kasli factory was honored with the Golden Award (the small golden medal of the Free Economical Society). A year later, the factory was awarded the Small Silver Medal at St. Petersburg's Textile exhibition. Honorable diplomas and silver and golden medals were awarded at the World Exhibitions in Paris (1867), in Vienna (1873), Philadelphia (1876), Copenhagen (1888), Stockholm (1897), and again in Paris (1900).

Many renowned historical artistic sculptures and figures at Moscow and St. Petersburg, as well as the iron furniture at the Winter Palace, was produced by the Kasli factory.

References

Notes

Sources

External links

Official website of Kasli 
Kasli Business Directory  

Cities and towns in Chelyabinsk Oblast
Yekaterinburgsky Uyezd
Populated places established in 1747